The Super Smash Con is an annual Super Smash Bros. convention held at the Dulles Expo Center in Chantilly, Virginia. The event is held in early August that praises the video game series published by Nintendo along with other video games, and features competitions for every entry in the series. Side events feature other platform fighters, including Rivals of Aether, Slap City, and Nickelodeon All-Star Brawl.

History
Super Smash Con was established in 2015 by Justin Wykowski.

Due to the COVID-19 pandemic, Super Smash Con 2020 was cancelled. Super Smash Con added Nickelodeon All-Star Brawl as one of its tournaments in 2021.

Tournament winners

Notes

References

Super Smash Bros. tournaments
Nintendo events
Gaming conventions
Video game conventions